PGSS may refer to:
 Pennsylvania Governor's School for the Sciences
 Paget Gorman Signed Speech
 Prince George Secondary School, a high school in Prince George, British Columbia
 Point Grey Secondary School, a high school in Vancouver, British Columbia
 Panionios G.S.S., a Greek football club based in Nea Smyrni, Athens
 Particles from Gas Saturated Solutions, a method used for micronization of substances